Giblett is a surname. Notable people with the surname include:

Alf Giblett (1908–1943), Australian rules footballer
Eloise Giblett (1921–2009), American geneticist and hematologist
Michael Giblett (1934–1999), Australian rules footballer

See also
Gillett (surname)